Cornelius J. Jones (August 13, 1858 – March 13, 1931) was a lawyer and state legislator who represented Issaquena County in the Mississippi House of Representatives in 1890 and 1891 as a Republican.

Cornelius Jones was born in Vicksburg, Mississippi in 1858. He worked as a lawyer in Mayersville. He ran against T. C. Catchings for a seat in the U.S. Congress and contested the result. In addition to representing the plaintiffs in Johnson v. McAdoo, the "first documented federal litigation for reparations for slavery," Jones was a defense attorney for Henry Williams and appealed his death penalty conviction to the U.S. Supreme Court (Williams v. Mississippi). At that time, no African Americans were allowed to sit on juries in Mississippi and Jones' appeal to the U.S. Supreme Court regarding this was unanimously rejected by the Court.

Jones died in Oklahoma on March 16, 1931. The New York Public Library has a collection of his and his sister's family papers and several photographs of him.

See also
African-American officeholders during and following the Reconstruction era

References

1858 births
1931 deaths
19th-century American lawyers
African-American lawyers
African-American politicians during the Reconstruction Era
African-American state legislators in Mississippi
Mississippi lawyers
Mississippi Republicans
People from Mayersville, Mississippi
Politicians from Vicksburg, Mississippi